Iona was a Scottish independent record label from 1978 to 1990.

History
The label was founded by the band Scottish folk band Ossian to publish their second album St. Kilda Wedding. The label continued to publish Ossian output as well as solo and other additional projects from the band members. In 1985, Iona published The Wellpark Suite by Billy Jackson which was commission by Tennents Lager for its centenary celebrations. The label was acquired in 1990 by Lismor Recordings. Iona published 13 original titles prior to 1990 which were expanded over the years to 74 before ceasing new productions and moving the complete catalogue into the new digital world.

Iona frequently used sound engineer Calum Malcolm

Roster
 Ossian
 Billy/William Jackson
 Billy Kay & Jock Tamson's Bairns
 George Jackson
 Maggie MacInnes
 Tony Cuffe
 Eclipse First

Catalogue

See also
 List of record labels

References

External links
 Lismor Recordings

Record labels established in 1978
Record labels disestablished in 1990